The 2006–07 season was the third consecutive season of A.S. Livorno Calcio in the top flight.

Players

First-team squad

Competitions

Overall record

Serie A

League table

Results summary

Results by round

Matches

Coppa Italia

Round of 16

References 

U.S. Livorno 1915 seasons
Livorno